Paracapnia angulata, the angulate snowfly, is a species of small winter stonefly in the family Capniidae. It is found in North America. Its nymph is eaten by the steelhead trout.

References

External links

 

Plecoptera
Articles created by Qbugbot
Insects described in 1961